The following radio stations broadcast on AM frequency 585 kHz:

Australia
6PB at Perth, Western Australia
7RN at Hobart, Tasmania

Iran
 Radio Farhang in Tehran

References

Lists of radio stations by frequency